The 1892 Purdue Boilermakers football team represented Purdue University in the 1892 college football season. In their second year under head coach Knowlton Ames, the Boilermakers compiled an undefeated 8–0 record (5–0 Big Ten) and outscored their opponents by a total of 320 to 24, including victories over Illinois (12–6), Wisconsin (32–4), Michigan (24–0), Indiana (68–0), and Chicago (38–0). The team captain is identified in different sources as J. C. Teeters or Archibald Stevenson.

Schedule

Players
 H. L. Browne, quarterback
 Leon Crowell, left end
 Larry Downs, left guard
 Bill Finney, left tackle
 A. L. Fulkerson, left guard
 Gerber, left tackle
 Joseph R. Hudelson, halfback
 Alpha Jamison, left halfback
 S. M. Kintner, quarterback
 Jesse Little, right tackle
 Walt Muessel, right guard
 Edwin Olin, end
 Cecil Polk, right end
 Archibald Stevenson, center
 Jimmy Studebaker, fullback
 Jack Thompson, right halfback

References

Purdue
Purdue Boilermakers football seasons
College football undefeated seasons
Purdue Boilermakers football